The AutoGyro Calidus is a German autogyro, designed and produced by AutoGyro GmbH of Hildesheim.  The aircraft is supplied as a complete ready-to-fly-aircraft.

The Calidus was approved in the United Kingdom in 2010 in a modified form as the RotorSport UK Calidus.

Design and development

The Calidus features a single main rotor, a two-seats in tandem enclosed cockpit with a complete aerodynamic cockpit fairing, tricycle landing gear with wheel pants and a four-cylinder, air and liquid-cooled, four-stroke, dual-ignition  Rotax 912 engine or turbocharged  Rotax 914 engine in pusher configuration.

The aircraft fuselage is made from composites and is a faired teardrop shape to ensure smooth airflow over the variable pitch pusher propeller. The design incorporates vibration dampers that greatly reduce the level of main rotor vibration transmitted to the cockpit.

It was developed into the side-by-side configuration AutoGyro Cavalon.

Operational history
By December 2012 eight examples had been registered in the United States with the Federal Aviation Administration. Most are in the Experimental - Amateur-built or Experimental - Exhibition categories. Also by December 2012 three examples had been registered with Transport Canada in the Special Certificate of Airworthiness Limited category.

Variants
AutoGyro Calidus
Base model for the European and North American market.
RotorSport UK Calidus
Modified model for the United Kingdom market, imported assembled and modified by RotorSport UK.

Specifications (Calidus)

See also
Niki Lightning - autogyro

References

External links

Video flight report on AVweb

2000s German sport aircraft
Single-engined pusher autogyros
AutoGyro GmbH aircraft
Aircraft first flown in 2009